Vallakottai is a town near Chennai, India. It is situated on the highway between Sriperumbudur and Singaperumalkoil near Chengalpattu.

The Vallakottai Subramaniyaswami temple is in Vallakottai. The Subramaniya Swamy idol in this temple is the tallest Lord Muruga statue in India. People from various places visit this temple during festival days. 

Frequent bus facility is available to the village from Tambaram and Sriperumbudur.

Reference

Cities and towns in Kanchipuram district